A Tribute to Someone is an album by American jazz pianist Larry Willis recorded in 1988 and originally released on the Japanese Jazz City label before being reissued in the US on Evidence Music in 1998.

Reception 

Allmusic's Ken Dryden said: "Larry Willis has never achieved the acclaim that he deserves, but these rewarding 1993 studio sessions for Audioquest, which serve as a tribute to his old friend Herbie Hancock, represent some of his best work as a leader. Willis is clearly his own man, as he makes no attempt to mimic Hancock's keyboard style".

Track listing
All compositions by Larry Willis except where noted
 "King Cobra" (Herbie Hancock) – 7:06	
 "Wayman's Way" – 7:39
 "Sensei" – 6:24
 "Tribute to Someone" (Hancock) – 9:07
 "Maiden Voyage" (Hancock) – 7:06
 "For Jean" – 6:53
 "Teasdale Place" – 8:07

Personnel
Larry Willis – piano
Tom Williams – trumpet
Curtis Fuller – trombone
John Stubblefield – tenor saxophone, soprano saxophone
David Williams – bass
Ben Riley – drums

References

Sledgehammer Blues albums
Larry Willis albums
1994 albums